The following lists the number one albums on the Australian Albums Chart, during the 1960s. 
The source for this decade is the Kent Music Report. These charts were calculated in the 1990s in retrospect, by David Kent, using archival data. Album lists in Australia began in 1965.

1965

1966

1967

1968

1969

See also
List of number-one albums in Australia during the 1970s
List of number-one albums in Australia during the 1980s
List of number-one albums in Australia during the 1990s
List of number-one singles in Australia during the 1960s
List of number-one singles in Australia during the 1970s
List of number-one singles in Australia during the 1980s
List of number-one singles in Australia during the 1990s
List of artists who reached number one on the Australian singles chart
Music of Australia
List of UK Albums Chart number ones
List of UK Albums Chart number ones of the 1960s
List of Billboard 200 number-one albums

References
David Kent's Australian Chart Book based on Kent Music Report
Australian Record Industry Association (ARIA) official site
OzNet Music Chart

1960s
1960s in Australian music
Australia Albums